Bardeh Gar may refer to:

Bardeh Gar-e Do Vark
Bardeh Gar-e Mohuk